Ceratogyrus marshalli, also known as Straight Horned Baboon or Great Horned Baboon Tarantula, is a species of tarantula from the genus Ceratogyrus. It is found in Zimbabwe and Mozambique. It was first described by Reginald Innes Pocock in 1897, as half of the Ceratogyrus genus, they own a impressive horn in the carapace.

Description 
Females live from 8 to 10 years, while males only live 3 to 4. With a body length of 6 cm and a 15 cm legspan it is a fairly large species of Ceratogyrus. Their carapace is black with some light brown striping, of course their being their namesake straight black horn. Their opisthosoma is light brown, covered in black spotting, although sometimes a fishbone pattern is apparent. Their legs are a light brown, or grey depending on visible conditions.

Habitat 
They can be found in Harare, Zimbabwe, where this section will be referring to. This area is considered to have a subtropical highland climate. The average temperature here is 19ºC, with average yearly rainfall of 805mm, since it is found 1500m above sea level, it has a surprisingly stable temperatures.

Behavior 
They are a very defensive spider, as most tarantulas it will first try to flee, if unable it will result in stridulation or a bite. They are burrowing and will make a vertical tunnel leading to a burrow in the end. At daytime they will most likely be in said burrow, and at night she will stay vigilant at the edge of her tunnel.

See also 
 List of Theraphosidae species

References

Spiders of Africa

Theraphosidae
Spiders described in 1897